Chloe Ashcroft (born 7 July 1942) is an actress and former presenter of several BBC children's TV programmes, including Play School, Play Away, Hokey-Cokey, Excuse Me, All Change, and Pie in the Sky. She also appeared in the Doctor Who story Resurrection of the Daleks, playing Professor Laird.

Before her television career, she appeared in several stage plays in the 1960s, and returned to the stage in the 1980s. Outside of acting, she has worked as a teacher. She now lives in Whiteshill and Ruscombe in Gloucestershire with her husband, the actor David Hargreaves, with whom she has two children.

References

External links

1942 births
English television actresses
English television presenters
Living people
Actors from Gloucestershire
People from Stroud District
BBC television presenters
Schoolteachers from Gloucestershire